Haik Mikaeli Martirosyan (born 14 July 2000) is an Armenian chess player. He was awarded the title Grandmaster by FIDE in 2017.  he is the second-highest rated Armenian player.

Career 
Martirosyan won the World Youth Chess Championship in the Under 16 category in 2016. In 2017 he played for the World team that won the Match of the Millennials in St. Louis, US scoring 4 points from 7 games. In 2018, he won the Armenian Chess Championship and played for the Armenian team in the 43rd Chess Olympiad in Batumi with a performance rating of 2708. Later in the same year, he also won the Zurich Christmas Open edging out Rasmus Svane, S. L. Narayanan, Dennis Wagner and Andrei Istrățescu. In February 2019, Martirosyan shared first place with Kaido Külaots in the Aeroflot Open, finishing second on tiebreak. Martirosyan entered the Chess World Cup 2021 as the 59th seed. He defeated GM Shakhriyar Mamedyarov in the rapid tiebreaks for round 3, and advanced to round 5 after defeating GM Ante Brkić in round 4. He was eliminated in round five by GM Amin Tabatabaei.

References

External links
 
 
 
 

2000 births
Living people
Chess grandmasters
Armenian chess players
World Youth Chess Champions
Chess Olympiad competitors
Place of birth missing (living people)